"London Pride" is a patriotic song written and composed by Noël Coward during the Blitz in World War II.

Composition 
Coward wrote "London Pride" in the spring of 1941, during the Blitz. According to his own account, he was sitting on a seat on a platform in Paddington station, watching Londoners going about their business quite unfazed by the broken glass scattered around from the station's roof damaged by the previous night's bombing: in a moment of patriotic pride, he said that suddenly he recalled an old English folk song which had been apparently appropriated by the Germans for their national anthem, and it occurred to him that he could reclaim the melody in a new song.  The song started in his head there and then and was finished in a few days. In fact the tune of the German national anthem was composed by Joseph Haydn in 1797 in a different context.

The song has six verses. The opening lines, repeated three times within the song, are:

The flower mentioned is Saxifraga × urbium,  a perennial garden flowering plant historically known as London pride, which was said to have rapidly colonised the bombed sites of the Blitz. The song was intended to raise Londoners' spirits during that time, and was also circulated after the July 2005 bombings.

Melody 
Coward acknowledged one of the traditional cries of London ("Won't You Buy My Sweet-Blooming Lavender", also used in the musical Oliver) as the starting-point for the tune, but he also pointed out the similarity with "Deutschland über alles", which he claimed was based on the same tune.  It contrasts with many of the major-key, grandiose melodies used to celebrate patriotism, including God Save The King and Land of Hope and Glory.  Its orchestration also contrasts with those anthems, employing muted strings and a celeste, rather than a pipe organ and a choir.

Usage 
The music is used in the film This Happy Breed, including the closing titles. The song has since been covered by  artists such as Gracie Fields, Cleo Laine, and Donald Peers.

Julie Andrews sang the song on her 1957 debut album, The Lass with the Delicate Air. Damon Albarn and Michael Nyman recorded the song in 1998 for the Twentieth-Century Blues: The Songs of Noel Coward tribute album. To mark the 100th anniversary of Noël Coward's birth, Jeremy Irons sang a selection of his songs at the 1999 Last Night of the Proms held at the Royal Albert Hall in London, ending with "London Pride". In May 2015, Alexander Armstrong performed the song at VE Day 70: A Party to Remember at Horse Guards Parade in London.

References

External links 
 
 Words of the song

1941 songs
Songs written by Noël Coward
Songs about London
Songs about flowers